N.Y.H.C. is a documentary film directed by Frank Pavich about the mid-1990s New York hardcore scene. Filmed in mid-1995, it was completed and self-released on VHS by Pavich in 1999.

The documentary was acquired for distribution by HALO 8 Entertainment in December 2007. On March 25, 2008, Halo-8 released a two-disc special edition for the documentary's first time on DVD. Disc 2 features previously unreleased footage including "Where Are They Now?" interviews shot ten years after the original documentary, live performances of complete songs by Vision of Disorder, Madball, 25 ta Life, 108, No Redeeming Social Value, District 9, and more, as well as new interviews with Lou Koller (Sick of It All) and Toby Morse (H2O).

Plot
One of the few documentaries focusing on the hardcore music scene of one city, N.Y.H.C. featured seven bands prominent in the mid-90s scene.  A diverse grouping was selected, from Long Island suburbanites to Bronx inner-city youth to Hare Krishna devotees.

Live performances
The featured bands are:
Madball
25 ta Life
Vision of Disorder
Crown of Thornz
108
No Redeeming Social Value
District 9

Interviewees
Interviewees include:
Freddy Madball (Madball)
Rick ta Life (25 ta Life)
Roger Miret (Agnostic Front)
John Joseph (Cro-Mags)
Lord Ezec (Crown of Thornz)
Mike Dijan (Crown of Thornz)
Kevin Gill (SFT Records)
Barbara Kenngott (SFT Records)
Vic DiCara (108)
Rasaraja dasa aka Rob Fish (108)
Trivikrama dasa (108)
Jimmy Gestapo (Murphy's Law)
Tommy Rat (Rejuvenate)
Dean Miller (No Redeeming Social Value)
Vinnie Value (No Redeeming Social Value)
K love the Sonic Maximizer (No Redeeming Social Value)
Mike Dixon (No Redeeming Social Value)
Chris Wynne (In Effect Magazine)
Tim Williams (VOD)
Mike Kennedy (VOD)
Mike Fleischmann (VOD)
Brendan Cohen (VOD)
Matt Baumbach (VOD)
Myke Rivera (District 9)
Cesar Ramirez (District 9)
Todd Hamilton (District 9)
Loki Velasquez (District 9)

Notable in this film is interview footage of Roger Miret while using a wheelchair due to a vertebrae injury sustained at a show.

Film festivals
Chicago Underground Film Festival - 1999
Euro Underground Film Festival - 1999
Hot Springs Documentary Film Festival - 2000
New York Underground Film Festival - 2000
Sound Unseen Film & Music Festival - 2000
Mostra Internacional de Cinema (Brazil) - 2001

Soundtrack
The N.Y.H.C. Documentary Soundtrack was released in 1996 prior to the film’s release by SFT Records on compact disc. It was intended to help raise funds for the completion of the documentary itself (which was finally completed & released in 1999). This CD featured live tracks as well as interview clips.  The featured bands are Madball, 25 ta Life, Vision of Disorder, 108, Crown of Thornz, No Redeeming Social Value, and District 9.

All tracks were recorded live in mid-1995.

Track listing
Crown of Thornz - "Juggernaut"
25 ta Life - "Da Lowdown"
Kevin Gill of SFT Records (interview dialogue)
Vision of Disorder - "Suffer"
Virginia (interview dialogue)
District 9 - "Fool"
Freddy Madball (interview dialogue)
Madball - "New York City"
Rasaraja dasa of 108 (interview dialogue)
108 - "Solitary"
Vinnie & Dean of NRSV (interview dialogue)
No Redeeming Social Value - "New 64"
Myke & Todd of District 9 (interview dialogue)
District 9 - "Victim"
Rick ta Life (interview dialogue)
25 ta Life - "Separate Ways"
John Joseph of the Cro-Mags (interview dialogue)
108 - "Holyname"
Tim & Brendan of Vision of Disorder (interview dialogue)
Vision of Disorder - "Formula for Failure"
Roger Miret of Agnostic Front (interview dialogue)
Madball - "It's Time"
Madball - "Crucified" (with Roger Miret on vocals)
Dean & Vinnie of NRSV with Chris of In Effect Magazine (interview dialogue)
No Redeeming Social Value - "No Regrets"
Tim Williams, Matt Baumbach, Mike Kennedy & Mike Fleischmann of Vision of Disorder (interview dialogue)
Vision of Disorder - "D.T.O."
Ezec of Crown of Thornz (interview dialogue)
Crown of Thornz - "Crown of Thornz"

Home media
The film was released on DVD on March 25, 2008.

References

External links
 
 
 Podcast interview with Frank Pavich & Lord Ezec on Issue Oriented 2006

Documentary films about punk music and musicians
1999 directorial debut films
1999 films
Hardcore punk
Documentary films about New York City
Music of New York City
1999 documentary films
1990s English-language films
English-language documentary films